Revenge of the Pirates is a 1951 Italian adventure film directed by Primo Zeglio. It was the last movie of Maria Montez.

It is also known as The Pirates Revenge and Duel Before the Mast.

Plot
In 1675, Enrico di Roccabruna turns pirate to avenge his father's death.

Cast
 Jean-Pierre Aumont  as Enrico di Roccabruna
 Maria Montez  as Consuelo
 Milly Vitale  as Luana
 Roberto Risso  as Miguel
 Paul Muller  as Espinosa
 Franca Tamantini  as Conchita
 Saro Urzì  as Aguirre 
 Mimì Aylmer  as Isabella 
 Mario Castellani  as Armagnac 
 Sidney Gordon as Van Hiess 
 Enrico Glori  as Governor  
 Franca Marzi

Production
The film was shot in Rome. Jean Pierre Aumont says he and Montez celebrated their eighth wedding anniversary during filming on 13 July 1951. She would be dead by September.

References

External links 
 

1951 films
1951 adventure films
Italian adventure films
1950s Italian-language films
Films directed by Primo Zeglio
Films scored by Carlo Rustichelli
Films set in the 1670s
Pirate films
Italian black-and-white films
1950s Italian films